Kymi (Greek:) is a coastal town and a former municipality (7,112 inhabitants in 2011) in the island of Euboea, Greece, named after an ancient Greek place of the same name. Since the 2011 local government reform it is part of the municipality Kymi-Aliveri, of which it is a municipal unit. The municipal unit has an area of 167.616 km2. The ancient Euboean Kyme is mentioned as a harbor town related to the more prominent poleis of Chalkis and Eretria in antiquity. Together with these, it is sometimes named as the founding metropolis of the homonymous Kymē (Cumae) in Italy, an important early Euboean colony, which was probably named after it.

There are few or no archaeological traces of ancient Euboean Kyme, and its exact location is not known. A Bronze Age settlement has been excavated in nearby Mourteri. Some modern authors believe that Kyme never existed as an independent polis in historical times but that it was a mere village dependent on either Chalkis or Eretria.

Attractions
Kymi is a small town and the surrounding region overlooks the Aegean Sea. Due to its vantage point, Kymi is sometimes called "The Balcony of the Aegean". Kymi has one of the largest man-made ports in the country and serves as a transportation hub for the eastern Aegean Islands and northern Greece. The city Kymi is considered the greenest of Greece in terms of native vegetation and is second all in clean sand beaches. There are numerous tourist and sightseeing attractions, such as the house of the noted pathologist and researcher George Papanicolaou, inventor of the Pap smear, the Folklore Museum of Kymi, the Monastery of the Transfiguration, three small Byzantine churches in Oxilithos, the Archaeological Collection and the Archaeological Sites, and a ruined Venetian tower in San handkerchief etc. The most well known agricultural products produced in Kymi are figs, cherries and olive oil. Local specialties include the "cocoon display," handicrafts made from cocoons, and sweets such as baklava and almond.

Notable Kymiotes
 Georgios Papanikolaou (1883–1962), physician, a pioneer in cytology and early cancer detection, and the inventor of the Pap test for cervical cancer
 Major Ioannis Velissariou (1861–1913), popular hero of the Balkan Wars
 Admiral Nikolaos Pappas (1930–2013), commander of the destroyer , mutinied in 1973 in protest against the Regime of the Colonels, later Chief of the Navy and government minister.

Climate

Transportation

The road network in the Kymi region is quite underdeveloped. There is only one major road (regional road) connecting the city of Kymi with Chania Avlonariou (a part of Avlonari), Aliveri and from there to the Greek National Road 44 towards Chalkis and Karystos.

Sports
Kymi has a few basketball courts, as well as an outdoor football pitch. There is also a sports club called Kymi Sports Club, with teams in football, basketball and volleyball.

References 

Populated places in Euboea
Ancient Euboea
Cities in ancient Greece